The 1930 National Derby took place during August and September with the final being held at Harold's Cross Stadium in Dublin on 5 September 1930. It was the third edition of the event. The race at this stage was considered unofficial because it had not been ratified by the Irish Coursing Club.

The winner was Prince Fern, trained by J Harper.

Final result 
At Harolds Cross, 5 September (over 525 yards):

Distances 
¾ (lengths)

See also
1930 UK & Ireland Greyhound Racing Year

References

Greyhound Derby
Irish Greyhound Derby
Irish Greyhound Derby